John Hartree (born 3 January 1948) is a former  Australian rules footballer who played with South Melbourne in the Victorian Football League (VFL).

Notes

External links 

 

Living people
1948 births
Australian rules footballers from Western Australia
Sydney Swans players